Broadford is a small village in eastern County Clare, Ireland and a Catholic parish of the same name.

The R466 road passes through the village of Broadford between O'Callaghan's Mills and O'Briens Bridge. It is tucked into the Glenomra Valley on the southern slopes of the Slieve Bearnagh Mountains near Doon Lough.

The Catholic parish of Broadford is in the Diocese of Killaloe. It originated in the medieval parishes of Kilseily and Killokennedy. 
Part of Killokennedy was amalgamated with Kilseily to form what is now the parish of Broadford.  The parish today has three church buildings, which as of 2014 served about 800 parishioners.

See also
 List of towns and villages in Ireland

References

Towns and villages in County Clare
Parishes of the Roman Catholic Diocese of Killaloe